Zgornji Motnik is a dispersed settlement in the hills north of Motnik in the Tuhinj Valley in the Municipality of Kamnik in the Upper Carniola region of Slovenia. It includes the hamlets of Bela, Koprivše, Srobotno, Vrh, and Brezovica.

References

External links

Zgornji Motnik on Geopedia

Populated places in the Municipality of Kamnik